Rebecca Ann Quinn Dussault (born November 14, 1980) is an American cross-country skier who was born and raised in Gunnison, Colorado. She is married with five children.  She participated in the 2006 Winter Olympics and was featured on EWTN's Life on the Rock Catholic TV show for her zeal of her faith and her active Catholic lifestyle.

Cross-country skiing results
All results are sourced from the International Ski Federation (FIS).

Olympic Games

World Championship results

World Cup

Season standings

References

External links 

 Dussault Skis Website
 Rebecca's U.S. Olympic Team bio
 Rebecca's Life on the Rock Interview (Audio Stream)

1980 births
Living people
People from Gunnison, Colorado
American female cross-country skiers
Cross-country skiers at the 2006 Winter Olympics
Olympic cross-country skiers of the United States
Catholics from Colorado
21st-century American women